Pak Jong-nam is a North Korean politician. He is a member of the Political Bureau of the Central Committee of the Workers' Party of Korea and Chairman of the Kangwon Province Provincial Party Committee.

Biography
In March 1996, he took over as the WPK Committee of Hamhung, and in July 2001 was appointed secretary of Kangwon Province WPK Committee. In May 2013, he became the party secretary in Kangwon Province succeeding . In May 2016, at the 7th Congress of the Workers' Party of Korea he was appointed a member of the Central Committee. In June 2016 he was elected chairman of the Party Committee of Kangwon Province.

References

Kangwon Province (North Korea)
Year of birth missing (living people)
Living people
Members of the 8th Central Committee of the Workers' Party of Korea